Bathyfautor coriolis is a species of sea snail, a marine gastropod mollusc in the family Calliostomatidae.

Description

Distribution
This species was found in the Coral Sea off the Chesterfield plateau.

References

 Marshall, B. A. (1995). Calliostomatidae (Gastropoda: Trochoidea) from New Caledonia, the Loyalty Islands, and the northern Lord Howe Rise. in: Bouchet, P. (Ed.) Résultats des Campagnes MUSORSTOM 14. Mémoires du Muséum national d'Histoire naturelle. Série A, Zoologie. 167: 381–458

External links

coriolis
Gastropods described in 1995